Comedy Underground with Dave Attell is a stand-up comedy series on Comedy Central. The series has featured fellow comics Jeff Ross, Amy Schumer, Jermaine Fowler, Ari Shaffir, Judah Friedlander, Brad Williams, Jay Oakerson, Nikki Glaser, Kurt Metzger, Ali Wong, Louis Katz, Junior Stopka, Luenell, Russ Meneve, April Macie, Ralphie May, Al Jackson, Jimmy Shubert, Tom Rhodes, Triumph the Insult Comic Dog, and Artie Lange.

Episodes

References

External links
 
 Website

2010s American late-night television series
English-language television shows
Comedy Central original programming
2010s American stand-up comedy television series
2014 American television series debuts
2014 American television series endings
Comedy Central late-night programming